Arabella Morton (born 18 November 2000) is an Australian actor best known for the role of Gael in the 2010 fantasy-adventure film The Chronicles of Narnia: The Voyage of the Dawn Treader, as well as appearances in San Andreas (2015) and Seeking Sorrel Wood (2011).

Filmography

Film

References

External links

2000 births
Living people
21st-century Australian actresses
Actresses from Queensland
People from Ipswich, Queensland